Francisco Inácio Marcondes Homem de Melo (1837-1918), also known as the Baron Homem de Melo, was a Brazilian lawyer, historian, cartographer, politician and professor. He was born in Pindamonhangaba in 1837. He studied law in Sao Paulo, and upon graduation returned to his birthplace, where he was elected President of the City Council. Through the 1860s and 1870s, he served in various responsible positions in São Paulo, Ceará, Rio Grande do Sul and Bahia. In Rio Grande do Sul, in just three months he managed to raise, organize and dispatch the 3rd Army to the theater of war in Paraguay, at the behest of General Manuel Luís Osório.

He held the position of director of Banco do Brasil for two terms (1869-1874 and 1876-1878). From 1873 to 1878, he led the inspectorate of primary and secondary public education in Rio de Janeiro, under the cabinet of João Alfredo. During this five-year period he was also president of the São Paulo-Rio de Janeiro Railroad Company. As president of the Province of Bahia (1878), he provided outstanding services to the capital, linking the lower city to the upper city through Rua da Montanha, later named after him. 

On March 28, 1880, he was appointed Minister of the Empire in the cabinet of José Antônio Saraiva, remaining in the post until the fall of the cabinet, on November 3, 1881. He also served twice as the interim Minister of War. 

After the formation of the Brazilian Republic, he left active politics and returned to teaching and other scholarly activities. In April 1889, with the founding of the Military College, Baron Homem de Melo was appointed professor of Universal History and Geography. In 1896, when Raul Pompeia died, he succeeded him in teaching Mythology at the National School of Fine Arts, where he became full professor of History of the Arts.

He was a member of the Brazilian Historical and Geographical Institute (which he entered in 1859), of the Historical Institute of São Paulo and of the Argentine Geographical Institute. He was the second occupant of chair 18 of the Brazilian Academy of Letters, to which he was elected on December 9, 1916, in succession to José Veríssimo. Unfortunately, he died in Campo Belo before taking office. He was supposed to have been received by academician Félix Pacheco.

References

Brazilian politicians
1837 births
1918 deaths
People from Pindamonhangaba